TSS Wyvern was a passenger vessel built for the Midland Railway in 1905.

History

TSS Wyvern was built by Ferguson Shipbuilders, Port Glasgow for the Midland Railway. She was launched on 10 October 1905. She was named the Wyvern after the company crest of the Midland Railway.

She was used for pleasure excursions from Heysham to Fleetwood until 1939. She was acquired by the London Midland and Scottish Railway in 1923 and British Railways in 1960. and disposed of in 1970.

References

1905 ships
Passenger ships of the United Kingdom
Steamships of the United Kingdom
Ships built on the River Clyde
Ships of the Midland Railway
Ships of the London, Midland and Scottish Railway
Ships of British Rail